Walter A. Rosenblum (1919–2006) was an American photographer. He photographed the World War II D-Day landing at Normandy in 1944. He was the first Allied photographer to enter the liberated Dachau concentration camp. He received several military decorations including a Purple Heart. His photography is on display in museums around the world.

Biography
Rosenblum was born on October 1, 1919, in New York City.

Rosenblum was a member of the New York Photo League where he was mentored by Paul Strand and Lewis Hine. He became president of the League in 1941. He taught photography at Brooklyn College for 40 years.

During the McCarthy years, he and the rest of the members of the New York Photo League were blacklisted.

From 1952 to 1976, he spent summers in Norfolk, CT, as a professor at the Yale Summer School of Music and Art, where he taught photography.

His wife was photographic historian Naomi Rosenblum. They had two daughters, Lisa and documentary filmmaker Nina.

Rosenblum died January 23, 2006.

Collections
The J. Paul Getty Museum
The Museum of Modern Art

Awards and honors
Lifetime achievement award - International Center of Photography (1998)

Decorations

References

1919 births
2006 deaths
20th-century American photographers
Brooklyn College faculty
Recipients of the Silver Star